Roman Rapids is a white-water river rapids ride located in Festa Italia of Busch Gardens Williamsburg, Virginia.  It is themed after a canal race through Roman ruins and leaves riders fully soaked after the ride.

Ride experience
Once riders board the six-passenger raft, the moving platform the raft shortly bonds to releases its grips and sends the raft spinning off, slowly at first but reaching quick speeds at points.  At first, riders are teased into thinking the ride is calm, but it soon picks up when water jets shoot water opposite the direction of the current, causing white water and rapids.  After barely avoiding being drenched by a statue fountain, the raft spins by a balcony with twenty-five cent machines that activate water squirters that try to wet riders.  After sliding down a short drop, the raft then races to a pool, keeping the raft on-track only by column ruins that look too far apart.  Next, rapids carry the raft towards four large waterfalls which are almost impossible to not be drenched from.  Passengers are then taken up a hill to be returned to the boarding platform. Due to the unpredictability of the rapids and the chain movement patterns at the station, riders will rarely go through the same experience on the ride twice (i.e. one person catching all 3 waterfalls at the end on one ride and the same person catching none the next time they ride).

See also
 Busch Gardens Williamsburg

References

Busch Gardens Williamsburg